Brenner Lake may refer to:

Brenner Lake (Minnesota)
Brennersee, a lake in Austria